Thai Honda Football Club (Thai: สโมสรฟุตบอลไทยฮอนด้า) was a Thai football club playing in the Thai League 2 and sponsored by Honda. The club was dissolved at the end of the 2019 season.

History
Honda Motorcycle Thailand, or A.P. Honda, started to send teams in the Samutprakarn Cup for the first time in 1971, by having factory employees play. In 2000, they established a football club "Thai Honda Ladkrabang Football Club". The club was promoted to Thai League 1. Some notable players for Thai Honda Ladkrabang were Prasert Choei-taisong, Tripob Chuenchuklin, and Thongchai Kuenkuntod. They were led by head coach Chalermwoot Sa-ngapol. In the next two years, the club was relegated to play in a lower league. To combat this, they changed their management to Phaya Insee Lat Krabang Company Limited in 22 January 2015. The first act of the company was inviting Masami Taki, a Japanese football coach, to cooperate the club service system and manage the youth development program for the success of the club.

In 2019 Thai Honda decided to dissolve the club due to financial problems.

Crest history
Thai Honda F.C. add text LADKRABANG into their logo in 2017 because Thai Honda factory was located in Ladkrabang and they changed their logo's background color from white to gold in 2017. In 2018 they decided to change the name of the club back to their original name "Thai Honda".

Stadium
72nd Anniversary Stadium (Min Buri) is a home stadium of Thai Honda Football Club since 2007. The stadium holds 10,000 people.

Stadium and locations

Season By Season Record

Club achievements
Thai Division 1 League:
Winner: 2016
Runner-up: 2005
Regional League Division 2:
Runner-up: 2014
Regional League Bangkok Area Division:
Winner: 2012, 2014
 Khǒr Royal Cup (Tier 3) (ถ้วย ข.):
Winner: 2004
 Khor Royal Cup (Tier 4) (ถ้วย ค.):
Winner: 2003
 Ngor Royal Cup (ถ้วย ง.):
Runner-up: 2002

References

External links
 Official Website
 Official Facebook
 Official facebook of team B

 
Association football clubs established in 1998
Thai League 1 clubs
Football clubs in Thailand
Sport in Bangkok
1998 establishments in Thailand
Works association football clubs in Thailand